The 2000–01 Eredivisie season was contested by 18 teams. PSV won the championship.

League standings

Results

Promotion/relegation play-offs
In the promotion/relegation competition, eight entrants (six from the Eerste Divisie and two from this league) entered in two groups. The group winners were promoted to (or remained in) the Eredivisie.

See also
 2000–01 Eerste Divisie
 2000–01 KNVB Cup

References

 Eredivisie official website - info on all seasons 
 RSSSF

Eredivisie seasons
Netherlands
1